Moravice is a river in the Czech Republic, the right tributary of the river Opava. It originates in the Hrubý Jeseník mountain range at the elevation of 1,135 m and flows south-eastward. Near Opava it enters the Opava River. It is 100.5 km long, and its basin area is 899.9 km2. The river partially forms the historical border between Moravia and Silesia.

It flows through Malá Morávka, Dolní Moravice, Břidličná, Kružberk, Staré Těchanovice, Hradec nad Moravicí, Branka u Opavy and Opava. The Slezská Harta Reservoir and Kružberk Reservoir are constructed on the river. Its major tributary is Hvozdnice.

References

Rivers of the Moravian-Silesian Region
Bruntál District
Opava District